Manhattan Tower may refer to:

Manhattan Tower (film), a 1932 film
Manhattan Tower, a composition released in 1946 as a 78-rpm album by Gordon Jenkins
Manhattan Tower (Gordon Jenkins album), a 1956 album on Capitol Records, consisting of an enlargement and expansion of his 1946 composition
Manhattan Tower (Patti Page album), a 1956 album by Patti Page, a version of the Gordon Jenkins composition
Manhattan Tower (Tel Aviv), a skyscraper currently under construction in Tel Aviv, Israel